{{DISPLAYTITLE:C19H19N3O3}}
The molecular formula C19H19N3O3 may refer to:

 MMPIP, a drug used in scientific research that acts as a selective antagonist for the metabotropic glutamate receptor subtype mGluR7
 Talampanel, a drug which has been investigated for the treatment of epilepsy, malignant gliomas, and amyotrophic lateral sclerosis